Long Creek Township is one of fifteen current townships in Searcy County, Arkansas, USA. As of the 2010 census, its total population was 474.

Geography

References
 United States Census Bureau 2008 TIGER/Line Shapefiles
 United States Board on Geographic Names (GNIS)
 United States National Atlas

 Census 2010 U.S. Gazetteer Files: County Subdivisions in Arkansas

External links
 US-Counties.com
 City-Data.com

Townships in Searcy County, Arkansas
Townships in Arkansas